Judith Ann Clements  is an Australian academic and educator, specializing in Kallikrein proteases in prostate and ovarian cancers. Clements is the scientific director at the Australian Prostate Cancer Research Centre – Queensland and was head of the Cancer Research Program at the Institute of Health and Biomedical Innovation (IHBI) of Queensland University of Technology at the Translational Research Institute (Australia) from 1997–2014.

Research
The Cancer Research Program led by Clements at QUT-IHBI, aims to more clearly understand the molecular and cellular basis for the development, progression, and metastasis of solid tumours.

Clements has commented on her research, stating:
"The primary interest of my group within the Hormone Dependent Cancer Program is the tissue kallikrein family of serine proteases. Our group was one of three worldwide that identified and characterised the expanded human tissue kallikrein gene locus on chromosome 19q13.4 in 1999. Since that time, our research has focused on defining the roles of particular kallikreins, and their variant forms, in hormone dependent cancers such as prostate, ovarian and endometrial cancer. We have used conventional/real time PCR and immunohistochemistry to determine the association of kallikrein expression with clinical disease to determine their usefulness as biomarkers for detection, prognostic outcome and therapeutic approaches. We are also utilizing over-expression and knockout systems to determine the effect of kallikrein expression in cancer cell lines at the cell biology level. Other studies in progress are directed to understanding the structure/function of the kallikreins, their substrate specificity and in vivo interacting proteins and genomic regulation. Other protease research interests are the type 2 trans membrane serine proteases (with Dr John Hooper) and the ADAMs (with Prof Adrian Herington and Dr Dimitri Odorico).

Education
Clements completed her PhD in Endocrinology at Monash University in 1989, her Master of Applied Science in 1983, after completing her Bachelor of Applied Science in 1982 and Diploma of Laboratory Technology in 1969 at the Royal Melbourne Institute of Technology.

Awards
 2017 Fellow of the Australian Academy of Health and Medical Sciences
2015 Companion of the Order of Australia
 2012	Women in Technology (WiT) Biotech Outstanding Achievement Award
 2011	Queensland University of Technology Vice Chancellor's Award for Research Excellence
 2007	Gold Medal, E.K.Frey–E.Werle Foundation for pioneering work in the Kallikrein field
 2006	Research featured in "Ten Of The Best" National Health and Medical Research Council funded health and medical research successes
 2005	Alban Gee Prize, Urological Society of Australasia Annual Scientific Meeting
 2001	Queensland University of Technology Faculty of Science Distinguished Award for Excellence in Research
 2000	National Health and Medical Research Council Principal Research Fellowship
 2000	Silver Medal and Honorary Membership of the E.K.Frey–E.Werle Foundation (awarded at the International Conference, Kinin 2000, Munich)
 1998	Alban Gee Prize, Urological Society of Australasia Annual Scientific Meeting
 1995	National Health and Medical Research Council Senior Research Fellowship
 1991	Prize for an "Outstanding Presentation", Kinin 91, International Conference on Kallikreins and Kinins, Munich, Germany.

References

External links
 Prostate Cancer Research Alliance
 Prostate Cancer Research Centre profile

Living people
Place of birth missing (living people)
Year of birth missing (living people)
Australian medical researchers
Companions of the Order of Australia
Fellows of the Australian Academy of Health and Medical Sciences
RMIT University alumni
Monash University alumni
Cancer researchers